Patapsco High School and Center For The Arts is a public high school in the United States, located in Dundalk in Baltimore County, Maryland, near Baltimore.

About the School
Patapsco is located in the suburban community of Dundalk, in southeastern Baltimore County.  The school boundaries include the north side of Wise Avenue, Langport Rd., Inverness Rd., and North Boundary Road.  The building and adjacent fields occupy an entire city block in the Gray Haven neighborhood, just north of the West Inverness neighborhood.  Built in 1963, the single-story building has a maximum capacity of 2000 students. The original students in September, 1963 included sophomores and juniors. The first graduating class was in 1965. The serving area of Patapsco borders the serving areas of Sparrows Point High School to the south and west, as well as Dundalk High School to the east.  In addition, students from throughout Baltimore County may also apply to the magnet programs, which include Visual Arts, Literary Arts, Dance, Instrumental Music, Theatre, Theatre Tech, and Vocal Music.

Academics
Patapsco High school received a 40.3 out of a possible 97 points (52%) on the 2018-2019 Maryland State Department of Education Report Card and received a 3 out of 5 star rating, ranking in the 32nd percentile among all Maryland schools.

Students
The 2019–2020 enrollment at Patapsco High School and Center for the Arts was 1434 students.

The current graduation rate for the school is 89.68%. Enrollment at the school is currently leveling off at just under 1500, down from a 19-year high of 1650 in 2006.

Athletics

State championships
Boys Soccer
Class AA 1976, 1977
2A 1995

Magnet Program

Patapsco incorporated a performing and visual arts magnet in 1995, and has since become a leader in the state for its programs in vocal and instrumental music, performance and technical theatre, dance, and visual art.  Students are required to audition for these magnet programs the year prior to attending.  Patapsco was recently one of five schools in the nation to be awarded the John F. Kennedy Center for the Performing Arts School of Excellence in Arts Education.  The individual programs have also won numerous awards and championships locally, regionally, and nationally.

Notable alumni
 Ron Franklin, former Eclipse Award winning jockey
 John O'May, Australia-based actor

References

External links
 Patapsco High School and Center For The Arts Homepage 

Educational institutions established in 1963
Public high schools in Maryland
Magnet schools in Maryland
Baltimore County Public Schools
Middle States Commission on Secondary Schools
1963 establishments in Maryland